Alex Masibaka is an Australian rugby union player who plays for the  in Super Rugby. His playing position is flanker. He was named in the Force squad as for Round 11 of the 2022 Super Rugby Pacific season. He made his debut in the same fixture, coming on as a replacement.

Reference list

Australian rugby union players
Living people
Rugby union flankers
Western Force players
Year of birth missing (living people)
Montpellier Hérault Rugby players